Abigail Becker (1830 – 1905), known as the Angel of Long Point, was a Canadian woman credited with saving the lives of numerous sailors caught in storms along the shores of Long Point. When the storms had passed, she would wade in the water as far as she could to rescue trapped seamen from their doomed ships.

Biography 
After marrying a widower and taking on the care of his six children, she settled in a trapper's cabin on Long Point, Lake Erie. On 23 November 1854, with her husband away, she single-handedly rescued the seven-man crew of the Buffalo-based schooner Conductor, which had run aground in a storm during the night.  The crew had clung to the frozen rigging in the darkness and, despite her inability to swim, she waded chin-high into the water after dawn to help the stricken sailors reach shore.

In another incident, four sailors arrived at the door of the Beckers' cabin, in the midst of a severe fall gale and snowstorm.  Apparently they were only four of six survivors from a schooner that had gone ashore during the night, but two of them had given up and collapsed a mile or so from the cabin.  Abigail invited the four in to warm up by the fire, and then set off in the snowstorm with two of her boys and some warm clothing, to find the other survivors.  Miraculously, despite the severity of the storm and resulting limited visibility, she was able to locate the two and coerced them to get up and go on, practically pushing them back to her cabin.  All of the sailors survived.

During another late autumn gale, a schooner laden with barley went ashore near the Becker cabin.  All hands were rescued except for the cook, a woman, who went unaccounted for.  One morning one of Abigail's daughter's came running back to the cabin crying, "Mother!  Mother!  There's a woman in the schooner waving her arms at me!"  Abigail, not really believing her child, went to investigate anyway.  She peered down the open hatch of the wreck to find the cook, floating upright, her arms waving gently as the level changed with the heave of the seas through the broken hull.

She was awarded several medals for her heroism and the people of Buffalo collected $350 for her by public conscription. The New York Life Saving Benevolent Association struck a gold medal in Abigail's honor, and the Royal Humane Society did likewise.  When on a duck-hunting trip to Long Point, the Prince of Wales (later King Edward VII), made a point to meet with Abigail to present her with a gift.  Queen Victoria sent her a handwritten letter of congratulations and £50 as a reward.  She put the money towards buying her own farm.

After losing her husband, Jeremiah Becker, to a storm on the lake in January 1864, she raised seventeen children alone. At the age of seventeen, Abigail married Jeremiah, who already had six children – one girl and five boys. She and Jeremiah had an additional eight children together – five boys and three girls.  A few years after Jeremiah's death, Abigail married Henry Rohrer, with whom she had three more daughters.

Legacy 
 The story of the Conductor rescue is told in the song "The Angel Of Long Point" by Canadian band Tanglefoot https://www.youtube.com/watch?v=aOjzKH_O40A
 The song "Abigail" by Canadian Americana/Folk singer Tia McGraff. YouTube video: https://www.youtube.com/watch?v=N0bqoroIesg

References

Sources
The book The story of Abigail Becker, the heroine of Long Point, as told by her step-daughter, Mrs. Henry Wheeler
https://web.archive.org/web/20070927051613/http://www.kwic.com/~pagodavista/abigail.html
1945 article in The Windsor Star

External links
 

Canadian humanitarians
Women humanitarians
19th-century Canadian women
1830 births
1905 deaths